The Women's kumite 68 kg competition at the 2015 European Games in Baku, Azerbaijan was held on 14 June 2015 at the Crystal Hall.

Schedule
All times are Azerbaijan Summer Time (UTC+5).

Results
Legend
KK — Forfeit (Kiken)

Elimination round

Group A

Group B

Finals

References

External links

Women's kumite 68 kg
Euro